The National Board of Review Award for Best Acting by an Ensemble (or National Board of Review Award for Best Cast / National Board of Review Award for Best Ensemble Cast) is an annual film award given (since 1994) by the National Board of Review.

Winners

1990s
 1994: Prêt-à-Porter
 Katarzyna Figura, Anouk Aimée, Marcello Mastroianni, Sophia Loren, Kim Basinger, Stephen Rea, Lauren Bacall, Julia Roberts, Tim Robbins, Lili Taylor, and Sally Kellerman

 1995: The Usual Suspects
Kevin Spacey, Gabriel Byrne, Stephen Baldwin, Benicio del Toro, Kevin Pollak, Chazz Palminteri, and Pete Postlethwaite

 1996: The First Wives Club
Bette Midler, Goldie Hawn, Diane Keaton, Maggie Smith, Dan Hedaya, Sarah Jessica Parker, Stockard Channing, Victor Garber, Stephen Collins, Elizabeth Berkley, Marcia Gay Harden, Bronson Pinchot, Jennifer Dundas, Eileen Heckart, Philip Bosco, Rob Reiner, James Naughton, Ari Greenberg, and Aida Linares

 1997: The Sweet Hereafter
Ian Holm, Caerthan Banks, Sarah Polley, Tom McCamus, Gabrielle Rose, Alberta Watson, Maury Chaykin, and Stephanie Morgenstern

 1998: Happiness
Jane Adams, Jon Lovitz, Philip Seymour Hoffman, Dylan Baker, Lara Flynn Boyle, Justin Elvin, Cynthia Stevenson, Lila Glantzman-Leib, Gerry Becker, Rufus Read, Louise Lasser, Ben Gazzara, Camryn Manheim, Arthur J. Nascarella, Molly Shannon, Ann Harada, and Douglas McGrath

 1999: Magnolia
Tom Cruise, Pat Healy, Julianne Moore, Genevieve Zweig, Mark Flannagan, William H. Macy, Neil Flynn, Philip Seymour Hoffman, and Rod McLachlan

2000s
 2000: State and Main
Alec Baldwin, Charles Durning, Jim Frangione, Clark Gregg, Vincent Guastaferro, Michael Higgins, Philip Seymour Hoffman, Ricky Jay, Jonathan Katz, Linda Kimbrough, Jordan Lage, Morris Lamore, Patti LuPone, William H. Macy, Michael James O'Boyle, Sarah Jessica Parker, David Paymer, Rebecca Pidgeon, Charlotte Potok, Lionel Mark Smith, Allen Soule, and Julia Stiles

 2001: Last Orders
Michael Caine, Bob Hoskins, Tom Courtenay, David Hemmings, Ray Winstone, and Helen Mirren

 2002: Nicholas Nickleby
Jamie Bell, Jim Broadbent, Tom Courtenay, Alan Cumming, Edward Fox, Romola Garai, Christopher Plummer, Anne Hathaway, Barry Humphries, Charlie Hunnam, Nathan Lane, Timothy Spall, and Juliet Stevenson

 2003: The Lord of the Rings: The Return of the King
Sean Astin, Sean Bean, Cate Blanchett, Orlando Bloom, Billy Boyd, Bernard Hill, Ian Holm, Ian McKellen, Dominic Monaghan, Viggo Mortensen, John Noble, Miranda Otto, John Rhys-Davies, Andy Serkis, Liv Tyler, Karl Urban, Hugo Weaving, David Wenham, and Elijah Wood

 2004: Closer
Jude Law, Clive Owen, Natalie Portman, and Julia Roberts

 2005: Mrs Henderson Presents
Judi Dench, Bob Hoskins, Will Young, Christopher Guest, Kelly Reilly, and Thelma Barlow

 2006: The Departed
Anthony Anderson, James Badge Dale, Alec Baldwin, Leonardo DiCaprio, Matt Damon, Jack Nicholson, Martin Sheen, Ray Winstone, Vera Farmiga, and Mark Wahlberg

 2007: No Country for Old Men
Josh Brolin, Tommy Lee Jones, Javier Bardem, Kelly Macdonald, and Woody Harrelson

 2008: Doubt
Amy Adams, Viola Davis, Philip Seymour Hoffman, and Meryl Streep

 2009: It's Complicated
Alec Baldwin, Steve Martin, Meryl Streep, and Lake Bell

2010s
 2010: The Town
Ben Affleck, Chris Cooper, Rebecca Hall, Jon Hamm, Blake Lively, Pete Postlethwaite, and Jeremy Renner

 2011: The Help
Emma Stone, Viola Davis, Octavia Spencer, Bryce Dallas Howard, Allison Janney, Jessica Chastain, Chris Lowell, Mike Vogel, and Sissy Spacek

 2012: Les Misérables
Hugh Jackman, Russell Crowe, Anne Hathaway, Amanda Seyfried, Eddie Redmayne, Samantha Barks, Helena Bonham Carter, Sacha Baron Cohen, Aaron Tveit, Colm Wilkinson, and Frances Ruffelle

 2013: Prisoners
Hugh Jackman, Jake Gyllenhaal, Maria Bello, Viola Davis, Terence Howard, Melissa Leo, Paul Dano, and Dylan Minnette

 2014: Fury
Brad Pitt, Logan Lerman, Shia LaBeouf, Michael Peña, Jon Bernthal, Jason Isaacs, Scott Eastwood, Xavier Samuel, Brad William Henke, Anamaria Marinca, and Alicia von Rittberg

 2015: The Big Short
Christian Bale, Steve Carell, Ryan Gosling, Melissa Leo, Hamish Linklater, John Magaro, Brad Pitt, Rafe Spall, Jeremy Strong, Marisa Tomei, and Finn Wittrock

 2016: Hidden Figures
Taraji P. Henson, Octavia Spencer, Janelle Monáe, Kevin Costner, Kirsten Dunst, and Jim Parsons

 2017: Get Out
 Caleb Landry Jones, Daniel Kaluuya, Catherine Keener, Stephen Root, Lakeith Stanfield, Bradley Whitford, Allison Williams, Lil Rel Howery, and Betty Gabriel

 2018: Crazy Rich Asians
Awkwafina, Gemma Chan, Henry Golding, Ken Jeong, Lisa Lu, Harry Shum, Jr., Constance Wu, and Michelle Yeoh

 2019: Knives Out
Ana de Armas, Toni Collette, Daniel Craig, Jamie Lee Curtis, Chris Evans, Don Johnson, Katherine Langford, Jaeden Martell, Christopher Plummer, Michael Shannon, and Lakeith Stanfield

2020s
 2020: Da 5 Bloods
Chadwick Boseman, Paul Walter Hauser, Norm Lewis, Delroy Lindo, Jonathan Majors, Jasper Pääkkönen, Clarke Peters, Jean Reno, Mélanie Thierry, and Isiah Whitlock, Jr.
 2021: The Harder They Fall
Jonathan Majors, Idris Elba, Zazie Beetz, Regina King, Delroy Lindo, Lakeith Stanfield, RJ Cyler, Danielle Deadwyler
 2022: Women Talking
Rooney Mara, Claire Foy, Jessie Buckley, Judith Ivey, Ben Whishaw and Frances Mcdormand

See also
Independent Spirit Robert Altman Award
Screen Actors Guild Award for Outstanding Performance by a Cast in a Motion Picture
Critics' Choice Movie Award for Best Acting Ensemble

References

National Board of Review Awards
Film awards for Best Cast
Awards established in 1994
1994 establishments in the United States